Carlo Dionisotti (9 June 1908 in Turin – 22 February 1998 in London) was an Italian literary critic, philologist and essayist. An alumnus of Turin University and a lifelong friend of Arnaldo Momigliano, he shortly lectured at Oxford before moving to Bedford College, London, where he held the post of Professor of Italian from 1949 to 1970.

His most significant work, Geografia e storia della letteratura italiana (1967), is a collection of essays contesting Francesco De Sanctis' unitary perspective on the development of Italian literature and pointing out instead how local influences shaped the production of major Italian authors.

Awards and honors

Member of Accademia dei Lincei, from 1964
Fellow of the British Academy, from 1972
Feltrinelli Prize, 1982
Viareggio Prize, 1989, for the essay Appunti sui moderni. Foscolo, Leopardi, Manzoni e altri

References

External links
https://web.archive.org/web/20081005134516/http://www.letteratura.it/dionisotti/

Italian essayists
Male essayists
Italian literary critics
Italian philologists
Writers from Turin
1908 births
1998 deaths
20th-century Italian non-fiction writers
20th-century Italian male writers
Fellows of the British Academy
Italian male non-fiction writers
20th-century essayists
Academics of Bedford College, London
20th-century philologists
Italian emigrants to the United Kingdom